Micrommata is a genus of huntsman spiders that was first described by Pierre André Latreille in 1804.

Species
 it contains six species and one subspecies, all with a palaearctic distribution except M. darlingi, endemic to South Africa:
Micrommata aljibica Urones, 2004 – Spain
Micrommata aragonensis Urones, 2004 – Spain
Micrommata darlingi Pocock, 1901 – South Africa
Micrommata formosa Pavesi, 1878 – Algeria to Israel
Micrommata ligurina (C. L. Koch, 1845) – Mediterranean to Central Asia
Micrommata virescens (Clerck, 1757) (type) – Europe, Turkey, Caucasus, Russia (Europe to Far East), Iran, Central Asia, China, Korea, Japan
Micrommata v. ornata (Walckenaer, 1802) – Europe, Syria, Israel

See also
 List of Sparassidae species

References

Araneomorphae genera
Sparassidae
Spiders of Africa
Spiders of Asia
Taxa named by Pierre André Latreille